Eric Rucker is an American attorney and politician from the state of Kansas. A Republican, Rucker has represented the 20th district of the Kansas Senate, based in western Topeka, since 2018. He was defeated in the 2020 Republican primary by State Representative Brenda Dietrich.

In 2018, Rucker was appointed to the Senate to succeed fellow Republican Vicki Schmidt, who had been elected Kansas Insurance Commissioner. Rucker had previously served as an Assistant Kansas Secretary of State starting in 2011, and before then as a Shawnee County Commissioner and a Deputy Assistant Secretary of State.

Rucker lives in Topeka with his wife, Joan.

References

Living people
Republican Party Kansas state senators
21st-century American politicians
Year of birth missing (living people)
Kansas Wesleyan University alumni
Emporia State University alumni
Washburn University School of Law alumni